Nigella sativa (black caraway, also known as black cumin, nigella, kalonji or siyahdaneh) is an annual flowering plant in the family Ranunculaceae, native to eastern Europe (Bulgaria and Romania) and Western Asia (Cyprus, Turkey, Iran and Iraq), but naturalized over a much wider area, including parts of Europe, northern Africa and east to Myanmar.

Etymology
The genus name Nigella is a diminutive of the Latin  'black', referring to the seed color. The specific epithet sativa means 'cultivated'.

In English, N. sativa and its seed are variously called black caraway, black seed, black cumin, fennel flower, nigella, nutmeg flower, Roman coriander, and kalonji.

Blackseed and black caraway may also refer to Elwendia persica, which is also known as Bunium persicum.

Description
The flowers are delicate, and usually coloured pale blue and white, with five to ten petals. The fruit is a large and inflated capsule composed of three to seven united follicles, each containing numerous seeds which are used as spice, sometimes as a replacement for black cumin (Bunium bulbocastanum).

Culinary uses
In the United States, the Food and Drug Administration classifies Nigella sativa L. (black cumin, black caraway) as Generally Recognized as Safe (GRAS) for use as a spice, natural seasoning, or flavouring. The seeds of N. sativa are used as a spice in many cuisines. In Palestine, the seeds are ground to make bitter qizha paste.

The dry-roasted seeds flavour curries, vegetables, and pulses.  They can be used as a seasoning in recipes with pod fruit, vegetables, salads, and poultry.  In some cultures, the black seeds are used to flavour bread products, and are used as part of the spice mixture panch phoron (meaning a mixture of five spices) and alone in many recipes in Bengali cuisine and most recognizably in some variations of naan, such as  nân-e barbari.  Nigella is also used in tresse cheese, a braided string cheese called majdouleh or majdouli in the Middle East.

History
Archaeological evidence about the earliest cultivation of N. sativa dates back three millennia, with N. sativa seeds found in several sites from ancient Egypt, including the Tomb of Tutankhamun.  Seeds were found in a Hittite flask in Turkey from the second millennium BC.

N. sativa may have been used as a condiment of the Old World to flavour food. The Muslim Persian physician Avicenna described N. sativa as a treatment for dyspnea in his The Canon of Medicine. N. sativa was used in the Middle East as a traditional medicine.

Chemistry
Oils are 32% to 40% of the total composition of N. sativa seeds. N. sativa oil contains linoleic acid, oleic acid, palmitic acid, and trans-anethole, and other minor constituents, such as nigellicine, nigellidine, nigellimine, and nigellimine N-oxide. Aromatics include thymoquinone, dihydrothymoquinone, p-cymene, carvacrol, α-thujene, thymol, α-pinene, β-pinene and trans-anethole.  Protein and various alkaloids are present in the seeds.

Research
One meta-analysis of clinical trials found weak evidence that N. sativa has a short-term benefit on lowering systolic and diastolic blood pressure, with limited evidence that black seed oil or powder can reduce triglycerides and LDL and total cholesterol, while raising HDL cholesterol. Despite considerable use of N. sativa in traditional medicine practices in Africa and Asia, there is insufficient high-quality clinical evidence to indicate that consuming the seeds or oil can be used to treat human diseases.

See also 
 Nigella damascena, also known as love-in-a-mist

References

External links

sativa
Medicinal plants
Spices
Herbs
Plants described in 1753
Taxa named by Carl Linnaeus